Gissi is a surname. Notable people with the surname include:

Dylan Gissi (born 1991), Swiss footballer
Kevin Gissi (born 1992), Swiss footballer, brother of Dylan